In constructive mathematics, a pseudo-order is a constructive generalisation of a linear order to the continuous case. The usual trichotomy law does not hold in the constructive continuum because of its indecomposability, so this condition is weakened.

A pseudo-order is a binary relation satisfying the following conditions:
 It is not possible for two elements to each be less than the other. That is, .
That is, .
 Every two elements for which neither one is less than the other must be equal. That is, 
This first condition is simply asymmetry. It follows from the first two conditions that a pseudo-order is transitive. The second condition is often called co-transitivity or comparison and is the constructive substitute for trichotomy. Constructively, given two elements of a pseudo-ordered set, it is not always the case that either one is less than the other or else they are equal, but given any nontrivial interval, any element is either above the lower bound, or below the upper bound.

The third condition is often taken as the definition of equality. The natural apartness relation on a pseudo-ordered set is given by
 
and equality is defined by the negation of apartness.

The negation of the pseudo-order is a partial order which is close to a total order: if x ≤ y is defined as the negation of y < x, then we have
 
Using classical logic one would then conclude that x ≤ y or y ≤ x, so it would be a total order. However, this inference is not valid in the constructive case.

The prototypical pseudo-order is that of the real numbers: one real number is less than another if there exists (one can construct) a rational number greater than the former and less than the latter. In other words, x < y if there exists a rational number z such that x < z < y.

Co-transitivity
The second condition deserves some considerations by itself.
It is called co-transitivity since a relation is transitive iff its complement satisfies condition 2.
Moreover, its following properties can be proven 

using classical logic.

If R is a co-transitive relation, then
 R is also quasitransitive;
 R satisfies axiom 3 of semiorders;
 incomparability w.r.t. R is a transitive relation; and
 R is connex iff it is reflexive.

Sufficient conditions for a co-transitive relation R to be transitive also are:
 R is left Euclidean;
 R is right Euclidean;
 R is antisymmetric.

A semi-connex relation R is also co-transitive if it is symmetric, left or right Euclidean, transitive, or quasitransitive. If incomparability w.r.t. R is a transitive relation, then R is co-transitive if it is symmetric, left or right Euclidean, or transitive.

Notes

References 
 

Constructivism (mathematics)
Order theory